This is a list of properties and districts in the Southeast quadrant of Washington, D.C. that are listed on the National Register of Historic Places.

Current listings

|}

References

Southeast